Aurora Carlson (born 1987, London) is a television presenter and China scholar.

In 2007, Aurora Carlson was hired as the youngest-ever PRC Foreign Expert to China Central Television (CCTV). She hosted a weekly series called Rediscovering China, a documentary-style program exploring socio-economic changes throughout the country. The show was filmed on-location at rural and urban sites across mainland China. She conducted interviews in Mandarin Chinese, followed by English commentary. She also wrote stories for CCTV News.

Carlson hosted a Mandarin Chinese language series broadcast, "Easy Chinese", daily during the 2008 Beijing Olympic Games. The 24-part series is due to be published into a book, by Popular Science Press (China).

She worked as a property management consultant to China National Offshore Oil Company (CNOOC). 
Also served as an op-ed columnist to China Daily.

Carlson was the head of Asia Investor Relations for OurCrowd.

References

External links 
 Rediscovering China Bio
 CCTV9
 Easy Chinese

1987 births
Living people
Television people from London
Paul H. Nitze School of Advanced International Studies alumni
University of Wisconsin–Madison alumni